Ornithinimicrobiaceae is a family of bacteria. It was created in 2018 after a large genome-based study of the Actinobacteria.

References

Micrococcales